is a 2016 Japanese drama film based on the novel by the same name by Ryo Asai. It was released in Japan by Toho on October 15, 2016.

Plot
Five university students gather to exchange information on their job search activities. They encourage each other and post their thoughts and worries on Twitter, but behind that they have a lot on their minds.

Takuto Ninomiya (Takeru Satoh) observes those around him. His roommate Kotaro Kamiya (Masaki Suda) has a bright personality and communicates well with others. Mizuki Tanabe (Kasumi Arimura) is Kotaro Kamiya's ex-girlfriend. Takuto Ninomiya has feelings for his roommate's ex-girlfriend. Rika Kobayakawa (Fumi Nikaidō) is determined to land a job. Takayoshi Miyamoto (Masaki Okada) is critical of job-seeking activities, but he later tries to get a job.

Cast
 Takeru Satoh as Takuto Ninomiya
 Kasumi Arimura as Mizuki Tanabe 
 Masaki Suda as Kotaro Kamiya
 Fumi Nikaidō as Rika Kobayakawa
 Masaki Okada as Takayoshi Miyamoto
 Takayuki Yamada as Takuto's Senior Sawa

References

External links
  

Japanese teen drama films
Toho films
2010s teen drama films
Films based on Japanese novels
2016 drama films
2010s Japanese films